This is a list of schools in Cornwall, England.

State-funded schools

Primary schools

Altarnun Primary School, Altarnun
Alverton Primary School, Penzance
Antony CE School, Antony
Archbishop Benson CE Primary School, Truro
Beacon ACE Academy, Bodmin
Berrycoombe School, Bodmin
Biscovey Academy, Par
Biscovey Nursery and Infants' Academy, Par
Bishop Bronescombe CE School, St Austell
Bishop Cornish CE Primary School, Saltash
The Bishops CE Learning Academy, Newquay
Blackwater Community Primary School, Blackwater
Blisland Primary Academy, Blisland
Bodriggy Academy, Hayle
Boscastle Community Primary School, Boscastle
Boskenwyn Community Primary School, Gweek
Bosvigo School, Truro
Boyton Community Primary School, Boyton
Braddock CE Primary School, East Taphouse
Breage CE School, Breage
Brunel Primary and Nursery Academy, Saltash
Bude Infant Academy, Bude
Bude Junior Academy, Bude
Bugle School, Bugle
Burraton Community Primary School, Saltash
Callington Primary School, Callington
Calstock Community Primary School, Calstock
Camelford Community Primary School, Camelford
Carbeile Junior School, Torpoint
Carclaze Community Primary School, St Austell
Cardinham School, Cardinham
Chacewater Community Primary School, Chacewater
Charleston Primary School, Carlyon Bay
Coads Green Primary School, Coad's Green
Connor Downs Academy, Connor Downs
Constantine Primary School, Constantine
Coverack Primary School, Coverack
Crowan Primary School, Praze-An-Beeble
Cubert School, Cubert
Cusgarne Primary School, Cusgarne
Darite Primary Academy, Darite
Delabole Community Primary Academy, Delabole
Delaware Primary Academy, Drakewalls
Devoran School, Devoran
Dobwalls Community Primary School, Dobwalls
Duloe CE Primary Academy, Duloe
Egloskerry School, Egloskerry
Falmouth Primary Academy, Falmouth
Flushing School, Flushing
Fourlanesend Community Primary School, Cawsand
Fowey Primary School, Fowey
Foxhole Learning Academy, Foxhole
Garras Community Primary School, Mawgan-in-Meneage
Germoe Community Primary School, Germoe
Gerrans School, Portscatho
Godolphin Primary School, Breage
Goonhavern Primary School, Goonhavern
Gorran School, St Goran
Grade-Ruan CE School, Grade-Ruan
Grampound Road CE Primary School, Grampound Road
Grampound-With-Creed CE Primary School, Grampound
Gulval Primary School, Gulval
Gunnislake Primary Academy, Gunnislake
Gwinear Community Primary School, Gwinear
Halwin School, Porkellis
Harrowbarrow School, Harrowbarrow
Heamoor Community Primary School, Heamoor
Illogan School, Illogan
Indian Queens Community Primary School, Indian Queens
Jacobstow Community Primary School, Jacobstow
Kea Community Primary School, Kea
Kehelland Village School, Kehelland
Kennall Vale School, Ponsanooth
Kilkhampton Junior and Infant School, Kilkhampton
King Charles Primary School, Falmouth
Ladock CE School, Ladock
Landewednack Community Primary School, The Lizard
Landulph School, Landulph
Lanivet Community Primary School, Lanivet
Lanlivery Primary Academy, Lanlivery
Lanner Primary School, Lanner
Launceston Primary School, Launceston
Leedstown Community Primary School, Leedstown
Lerryn CE Primary School, Lerryn
Lewannick Community Primary School, Lewannick
Liskeard Hillfort Primary School, Liskeard
Looe Primary Academy, East Looe
Lostwithiel School, Lostwithiel
Ludgvan School, Ludgvan
Luxulyan School, Luxulyan
Mabe Community Primary School, Mabe
Manaccan Primary School, Manaccan
Marazion School, Marazion
Marhamchurch CE Primary School, Marhamchurch
Marlborough School, Falmouth
Mawgan-In-Pydar Primary School, St Mawgan
Mawnan CE Primary School, Mawnan Smith
Menheniot Primary School, Menheniot
Mevagissey Community Primary School, Mevagissey
Millbrook CE Primary School, Millbrook
Mithian School, St Agnes
Mount Charles School, St Austell
Mount Hawke Academy, Mount Hawke
Mousehole School, Mousehole
Mullion Community Primary School, Mullion
Mylor Community Primary School, Mylor Bridge
Nancledra School, Nancledra
Nanpean Community Primary School, Nanpean
Nansledan School, Nansledan
Nansloe Academy, Helston
Nanstallon Community Primary School, Nanstallon
Newlyn School, Newlyn
Newquay Junior Academy, Newquay
Newquay Primary Academy, Newquay
North Petherwin School, North Petherwin
Otterham Community Primary School, Otterham
Padstow School, Padstow
Parc Eglos School, Helston
Pelynt Primary Academy, Pelynt
Pencoys Primary School, Four Lanes
Pendeen School, Pendeen
Pennoweth Primary School, Redruth
Penpol School, Hayle
Penponds School, Penponds
Penryn Primary Academy, Penryn
Pensans Community Primary School, Penzance
Pensilva Primary School, Pensilva
Perran-Ar-Worthal Community Primary School, Perranarworthal
Perranporth Community Primary School, Perranporth
Polperro Primary Academy, Looe
Polruan Primary Academy, Polruan
Pondhu Primary Academy, St Austell
Port Isaac Community Primary School, Port Isaac
Porthleven School, Porthleven
Portreath Community Primary School, Portreath
Probus Primary School, Probus
Quethiock CE Primary School, Quethiock
Roche Community Primary School, Roche
Rosemellin Community Primary School, Rosemelling
Roskear School, Roskear
St Agnes School, St Agnes
St Breock Primary School, Wadebridge
St Breward Community Primary School, St Breward
St Buryan Primary School, St Buryan
St Catherine's CE Primary School, Launceston
St Cleer Primary Academy, St Cleer
St Columb Major Academy, St Columb Major
St Columb Minor Academy, St Columb Minor
St Day and Carharrack Community School, St Day
St Dennis Primary Academy, St Dennis
St Dominic CE Primary School, St Dominic
St Erme With Trispen Community Primary School, St Erme
St Erth Community Primary School, St Erth
St Francis CE Primary School, Falmouth
St Germans Primary School, St Germans
St Hilary School, St Hilary
St Issey CE Primary School, St Issey
St Ives Infant School, St Ives
St Ives Junior School, St Ives
St John's RC Primary School, Camborne
St Just Primary School, St Just
St Keverne Community Primary School, St Keverne
St Kew ACE Academy, St Kew
St Levan Primary School, St Levan
St Mabyn CE Primary School, St Mabyn
St Maddern's CE School, Madron
St Mark's CE Academy, Morwenstow
St Martin's CE Primary School, Liskeard
St Mary's CE Primary School, Penzance
St Mary's CE School, Truro
St Mary's RC Primary School, Bodmin
St Mary's RC Primary School, Falmouth
St Mary's RC Primary School, Penzance
St Mawes Primary School, St Mawes
St Mellion CE Primary School, St Mellion
St Meriadoc CE Infant Academy, Camborne
St Meriadoc CE Junior Academy, Camborne
St Merryn School, St Merryn
St Mewan Community Primary School, St Mewan
St Michael's CE Primary School, Helston
St Minver School, St Minver
St Neot Community Primary School, St Neot
St Newlyn East Learning Academy, St Newlyn East
St Nicolas CE Primary School, Downderry
St Petroc's CE Primary School, Bodmin
St Stephen Churchtown Academy, St Stephen-in-Brannel
St Stephen's Community Academy, Launceston
St Stephen's Community Primary School, Saltash
St Teath Community Primary School, St Teath
St Tudy CE Primary School, St Tudy
St Uny CE Academy, Carbis Bay
St Wenn School, St Wenn
St Winnow CE School, Lostwithiel
Sandy Hill Academy, St Austell
Sennen Community Primary Academy, Sennen
Shortlanesend School, Shortlanesend
Sir Robert Geffery's CE Primary School, Landrake
Sithney Community Primary School, Sithney
Sky Primary, St Blazey
South Petherwin Community Primary School, South Petherwin
Stithians Community Primary School, Stithians
Stoke Climsland School, Stoke Climsland
Stratton Primary School, Stratton
Summercourt Academy, Summercourt
Threemilestone School, Threemilestone
Tintagel Primary School, Tintagel
Torpoint Nursery and Infant School, Torpoint
Trannack Primary School, Trannack
Tregadillet Primary School, Tregadillet
Tregolls School, Truro
Tregony Community Primary School, Tregony
Trekenner Community Primary School, Lezant
Treleigh Community Primary School, Treleigh
Treloweth Primary School, Redruth
Trenance Learning Academy, Newquay
Trenode CE Primary Academy, Looe
Treverbyn Academy, Treverbyn
Trevisker Primary School, St Eval
Trevithick Learning Academy, Camborne
Trewidland Primary School, Trewidland
Trewirgie Infant's School, Redruth
Trewirgie Junior School, Redruth
Troon Community Primary School, Troon
Truro Learning Academy, Truro
Trythall Community Primary School, Penzance
Tywardreath School, Tywardreath
Upton Cross ACE Academy, Upton Cross
Veryan CE School, Veryan
Wadebridge Primary Academy, Wadebridge
Warbstow Primary Academy, Warbstow
Weeth Community Primary School, Camborne
Wendron CE Primary School, Wendron
Werrington Community Primary School, Yeolmbridge
Whitemoor Academy, Whitemoor
Whitstone Primary School, Whitstone
Windmill Hill Academy, Launceston

Secondary schools

Bodmin College, Bodmin
Brannel School, St Stephen-in-Brannel
Budehaven Community School, Bude
Callington Community College, Callington
Camborne Science and International Academy, Camborne
Cape Cornwall School, St Just
Falmouth School, Falmouth
Fowey River Academy, Fowey
Hayle Academy, Hayle
Helston Community College, Helston
Humphry Davy School, Penzance
Launceston College, Launceston
Liskeard School and Community College, Liskeard
Looe Community Academy, Looe
Mounts Bay Academy, Heamoor
Mullion School, Mullion
Newquay Tretherras School, Newquay
Penair School, Truro
Penrice Academy, St Austell
Penryn College, Penryn
Poltair School, St Austell
Pool Academy, Pool
Redruth School, Redruth
Richard Lander School, Truro
The Roseland Academy, Tregony
St Ives School, St Ives
Saltash Community School, Saltash
Sir James Smith's School, Camelford
Torpoint Community College, Torpoint
Treviglas Academy, Newquay
Wadebridge School, Wadebridge

Special and alternative schools

Caradon Alternative Provision Academy, Liskeard
Community & Hospital Education Service AP Academy, Truro
Curnow School, Redruth
Doubletrees School, St Blazey
Nancealverne School, Penzance
Nine Maidens Alternative Provision Academy, Redruth
North Cornwall Alternative Provision Academy, Bodmin
Pencalenick School, St Clement
Penwith Alternative Provision Academy, Penzance
Restormel Alternative Provision Academy, St Austell

Further education
Callywith College
Cornwall College
Truro and Penwith College

Independent schools

Primary and preparatory schools
Polwhele House School, Truro
Truro School Preparatory School, Truro

Senior and all-through schools
St Joseph's School, Launceston
St Piran's School, Hayle
Truro High School, Truro
Truro School, Truro

Special and alternative schools
Fountain Head House School, Saltash
The Lowen School, Gunnislake
Oak Tree School, Threemilestone
Red Moor School, Lanlivery
Taliesin Education, Liskeard
Three Bridges, Blackwater

Cornwall
 
Lists of buildings and structures in Cornwall